George Siegrist Buehler, Jr. (born August 10, 1947 in) is a former American football offensive lineman in the American Football League and the National Football League.

High school career
Buehler played for Whittier High School and was the CIF Southern Section Player of the Year in 1964.  While attending Whittier High George also competed on the Wrestling and Track Teams.  In Track was a very successful Shot Putter/Discus Thrower, and, on the Wrestling Team, he was a four-year Varsity Heavyweight Champion, and, was the CIF Southern Section Heavyweight Champion in both his Jr.(1964) and Senior year 1965.  See CIF SS Record Sports Information Records

College career
Buehler played college football at Stanford University.

Professional career
George Buehler played for the Oakland Raiders from 1969 to 1978. From 1969 to 1970, Buehler was a replacement. He became a starter at right offensive guard for the Raiders from 1971 to 1977, but was used sparingly in 1978, replaced by Mickey Marvin, and ending his career with the Cleveland Browns in 1978 and 1979. He was part of a particularly strong offensive line during the 1976 season, featuring interior linemates Dave Dalby at center and Gene Upshaw at left guard. In the 1976 AFC championship game of the 1976–77 NFL playoffs, the Raiders beat the Pittsburgh Steelers, rushing for 157 yards and passing for 88 yards. The Raiders then beat the Minnesota Vikings in Super Bowl XI, rushing for a whopping 266 yards and passing for 180 yards, as Buehler overpowered the opposing defensive tackle, Doug Sutherland.

Personal
His nephew, David Buehler was the placekicker for the 2007 USC Trojans football team.  He was drafted by the Dallas Cowboys in the 2009 NFL Draft.

See also
List of American Football League players

External links
Bueler at Pro Football Reference
Raider starters

1947 births
Living people
Sportspeople from Whittier, California
Players of American football from California
American football offensive guards
Stanford Cardinal football players
Oakland Raiders players
Cleveland Browns players
American Football League players